Barrell is a surname. Notable people with the surname include:

Bernard Barrell (1919–2005), English musician, music educator and composer
Charles Barrell (1887–1959), New Zealand politician of the Labour Party
Charles Wisner Barrell (born 1885), writer and Shakespearean scholar
Donald Barrell (born 1986), rugby union player
George Barrell Emerson (1797–1881), American educator and pioneer of women's education
Francis Barrell (died 1679), MP for Rochester
Francis Barrell (1663–1724), MP for Rochester
Jim Barrell (born 1959), American professional wrestler
John Barrell (born 1943), British academic and currently Professor of English at the University of York
Joseph Barrell (1869–1919), American geologist
Joseph Barrell (merchant) (1739–1804), merchant in Boston, Massachusetts in the 18th century
Joyce Howard Barrell, née Gedye (born 1917), English composer
Rachel Barrell, British stage performer
Sue Barrell, British-born Australian meteorologist
Tony Barrell (broadcaster) (1940–2011), British-born Australian writer and broadcaster
Tony Barrell (journalist), British journalist
Tosh Barrell (1888–1960), English professional footballer